Joseph Forrester may refer to:

 Joe Forrester, an American crime/drama television series
 Joseph James Forrester (1809–1861), English merchant and wine shipper